Stenka Mountain is a mountain, 2,350 m, forming the central part of Spraglegga Ridge in the Payer Mountains of Queen Maud Land. Discovered and plotted from air photos by the German Antarctic Expedition, 1938/39. Mapped from air photos and surveys by Norwegian Antarctic Expedition, 1956–60; remapped by Soviet Antarctic Expedition, 1960/61, and named Gora Stenka (little wall mountain).

Mountains of Queen Maud Land
Princess Astrid Coast